The Authority of the Freeport Area of Bataan (AFAB)  is a government agency attached to the Office of the President of the Philippines that operates and manages the Freeport Area of Bataan (FAB) in Mariveles, Bataan, Philippines.

The FAB was originally designed as an Export Processing Zone. It is currently home to over 50 locators engaged in manufacturing products for export ranging from tennis balls to yachts. AFAB also has two locators using their facilities for warehousing, one locator engaged in animal feeds processing and an enterprise currently constructing a clean coal power plant. These enterprises employ a total of 13,443 workers.

The objective of the AFAB is to revive the area and expand the Freeport. To accomplish these objectives, the Freeport seeks to attract more locators in the manufacturing, Business Process Outsourcing (BPO),  electronics industries and green industries, among others. It is also seeking investors to boost its tourism capabilities by refurbishing its existing recreational facilities. The AFAB is also targeting new investors to build hotels, entertainment establishments, duty-free shops, resorts, team-building facilities, and sports facilities, among others, to encourage the influx of local and foreign tourists. It also hopes to attract a medical center to the Freeport with a view towards medical tourism. Finally,  it aims to encourage universities and colleges to locate in the area, to create and sustain a talent pool that can service the human resource needs of the locators.

History
In 1972, the Bataan Export Processing Zone (BEPZ) became the first official economic zone in the Philippines through Republic Act 5490 of 1969 primarily authored by Congressman Pablo Roman of Bataan and Presidential Decree 66 (with the latter also creating Export Processing Zone Authority (EPZA) which later became Philippine Economic Zone Authority (PEZA)). The BEPZ was one of the most progressive communities in Luzon during its first decade of operation. The area attracted over one hundred multinational locators. However, in the 90s to 2000s BEPZ (now renamed as Bataan Economic Zone or BEZ after the enactment of Republic Act 7916 in February 1995) stagnated and declined after it was outcompeted by two newly formed freeport zones from the remnants of American bases in nearby Clark and Subic Bay.

To put a halt to BEZ's decline and allow the zone to fulfill its original mandate to become a catalyst for progress and development in the region, Bataan 2nd District Congressman Albert S. Garcia authored a bill for the conversion of Bataan Economic Zone into a freeport. The Philippine Congress thereafter passed the Freeport Area of Bataan Act (Republic Act 9728), which was enacted into law on October 23, 2009.  This Act created the Freeport Area of Bataan (which will replace the Bataan Economic Zone (BEZ) on the last day of the administration of President Gloria Macapagal Arroyo and upon her successor Benigno Aquino III become President of the Philippines eight months later on June 30, 2010), a special economic zone and freeport with a dedicated governing authority, the Authority of the Freeport Area of Bataan (AFAB) which will take over the zone's operations and management from PEZA on the said date of June 2010.

During the transition period from BEZ to FAB in 2010, the question "Are you ready for the FAB?" is printed on signboards posted in various parts of Bataan, referring to the future Freeport Area of Bataan (FAB) which will replace BEZ on June 30 of the said year.

President Gloria Macapagal Arroyo appointed Deogracias G.P. Custodio as the first AFAB chairman and administrator in March 2010.

On June 30, 2010, Philippine Economic Zone Authority (PEZA) turned over the zone's operations and management to AFAB which officially started the management and operations of the latter over the zone, and resulted in the conversion of the zone from BEZ into FAB, abolishment of BEZ and the creation of the second freeport zone in the province after Subic Freeport in Morong and Hermosa pursuant to Section 28 of RA 9728, with Deogracias G.P. Custodio became the first AFAB chairman and administrator after being appointed three months earlier. AFAB initially had 39 enterprises and 12,777 workers by the time of conversion of the zone from BEZ to FAB on the said date which inherited from PEZA, AFAB's predecessor in the zone's operations and management, and BEZ which is FAB's predecessor.

AFAB issues its sticker to enter the zone's premises since 2011 which succeeded the BEZ sticker that were produced until 2010 and has been in use until 2011 or the first months of the zone as FAB.

On August 30, 2019, President Rodrigo Duterte signed Republic Act 11453, amending the provisions of RA 9728, and further strengthening the powers and functions of AFAB, enabling the freeport to expand its operation anywhere within the province of Bataan except the Hermosa and Morong portions of Subic Special Economic and Freeport Zone, another freeport zone located within the province and under the Subic Bay Metropolitan Authority (SBMA), as defined by R.A. No. 7227.

Logo

The first logo of AFAB, used from the conversion of the zone from Bataan Economic Zone (BEZ) to Freeport Area of Bataan (FAB) and turnover of the zone's operations and management from Philippine Economic Zone Authority (PEZA) to AFAB on June 30, 2010 to 2011, featured a phoenix symbol and AFAB text on a red rectangle, with the text "Authority of the Freeport Area of Bataan" in red below. The phoenix symbolized the change or transition from BEPZ/BEZ to FAB which happened on June 30, 2010 - a rebirth of sorts. This logo was only used for one year.

The second and current logo of AFAB, used since April 2011, features the FAB in blue text with red and blue swirl or spiral on the upper-right of the text, and the text "Freeport Area of Bataan" below. The swirl or spiral of the logo symbolizes growth, swirl's interlocking parts represents trade and partnership, and red and blue are reminiscent of national pride, with red exudes determination, passion and strength, and blue depicts stability and depth. This logo is currently used on the freeport zone's administration building since late 2011.

Administration
The Authority of the Freeport Area of Bataan (AFAB) is headed by a Chairperson, duly-elected from a 9-member AFAB Board of Directors (AFAB BOD), and an Administrator that oversees the day-to-day operations of the AFAB. The Administrator is also considered as a director and a member of the AFAB BOD, but shall in no case be, elected as the Chairperson or Vice-Chairperson of the AFAB BOD. Each Board member represents a sector that is vital to the growth and development of the FAB. All members, including the chairperson and the administrator, are appointed by the President of the Philippines.

The AFAB may grant to its FAB Registered Enterprises incentives under Republic Act No. 11534 or the Corporate Recovery and Tax Incentives for Enterprises Act (CREATE).

List of AFAB Chairman and Administrators

See also 
 Albert S. Garcia
 Camaya Coast
 Subic Bay Metropolitan Authority

Notes

References

External links 
 Freeport Area of Bataan official website

Industrial parks in the Philippines
Buildings and structures in Bataan
Bataan
Tax avoidance
Government agencies under the Office of the President of the Philippines
Government-owned and controlled corporations of the Philippines
Government agencies established in 2010
2010 establishments in the Philippines